James De Alwis (1823–1878) was a lawyer, writer, poet and a prominent colonial era legislator from Ceylon. He was an unofficial member of the Legislative Council. He is remembered for his writings that included several works on Buddhism.

Educated at the Colombo Academy as one of its first students, he was part of the Macaulay of Ceylon along with Frederick Nell and his brother Louis, Charles Ambrose Lorensz, John Prins, Charle Ferdinands and Dandris de Silva Gunaratna inspired by the Young England movement.

Qualified as a Proctor, he went on to become an Advocate and served as a District Judge and Police Magistrate. During his legal practice, his clients included Mudliyar Jeronis de Soysa (father of Sir Charles Henry de Soysa), Arunasalam Ponnambalam Mudliyar (father of Sir Ponnambalam Ramanathan) and S. Edirimanasingham, Mudaliyar of the Governor's Gate (grand uncle of Sir Ponnambalam Ramanathan)

Later he was appointed as an unofficial member of the Legislative Council of Ceylon; however he resigned together with George Wall, Charles Ambrose Lorensz, W. Thompson, John Capper and John Eaton on 15 November 1864 on a point of principle regarding the fiscal policy of the Government and its strict disregard to respect the procedures of the Legislative Council.

His eldest daughter Ezline Maria de Alwis married Sir Solomon Christoffel Obeyesekere and his third daughter Annie Lucy "Florence" D' Alwis married Felix Reginald Dias Bandaranaike I, who became a Judge of the Supreme Court of Ceylon.

Works
 Buddhism, 1862
  An Introduction to Kachchayana's Grammar of the Pàli Language, 1863
 The Attanagalu Vansa (A History of the Temple of Attanagalla), 1866
 Buddhist Nirvána, 1868  (A review of Max Müller's Dhammapada)
 Sedatsangarawa

References & External links

From a Reader’s Bookshelf by Arjuna More on Thrift and Arthur Alvis
Kumar Sangakkara steps forth like Young Ceylon
Not promoting the pretensions of' ‘literary theory'

1823 births
1878 deaths
District Courts of Sri Lanka judges
Sinhalese judges
Sinhalese lawyers
Sinhalese writers
Ceylonese advocates
Ceylonese proctors
Alumni of Royal College, Colombo
Members of the Legislative Council of Ceylon
Bandaranaike family